The 1969 Australian federal election was held in Australia on 25 October 1969. The incumbent Liberal–Country coalition government, led by Prime Minister John Gorton, won the election with a severely diminished majority over the opposition Labor Party, led by Gough Whitlam despite losing the two party popular vote. Both major parties had changed their leaders in the run-up to the election, the first time this had occurred since 1946. This was the first and only time that a Federal Government won a ninth consecutive term in office.

This election saw the arrival of future Prime Minister of Australia Paul Keating in Parliament, winning the safe Labor division of Blaxland in suburban Sydney – a seat he would represent until his resignation following the Keating Government's electoral defeat in 1996.

Issues
The 1969 election centred on the two leaders, John Gorton and Gough Whitlam. Both were leading their respective parties in an election for the first time. Gorton had initially been very popular and was promoted as an "average Aussie bloke". This image was boosted by his record of wartime service and his craggy, battered appearance (the result of a wartime injury). However, he gradually gained a reputation for being erratic and unnecessarily confrontational. By the time of the 1969 election campaign, his attempts to alter long-standing Liberal Party policies with regard to federal–state powers, and foreign affairs had alienated the more conservative sections of the Liberal Party and various state Liberal leaders, such as Henry Bolte and Bob Askin.

Whitlam, by contrast, had reformed Labor and abandoned unpopular policies such as the once-dominant White Australia Policy, as well as the commitment to socialism still held by many members on the left of the party. He presented a sleek and modern image which was able to win over new voters to his cause with a policy platform including free university education and universal health insurance. Whitlam had also managed to restore and heal the party's image as an electable alternative, something that had been impossible after the Labor Party split in 1955. Under his leadership, Whitlam had also attracted back many Catholic voters who had previously dumped Labor due to its infighting and factionalism. In addition, although the Coalition had won the biggest majority government in Australian history in 1966, it was increasingly seen as becoming tired and unfocused after 20 years in power. There were also growing concerns over Australia's involvement in the Vietnam War. The ALP thus went into the election with a good chance of increasing its small caucus.

Despite a Coalition campaign depicting Labor as a party dominated and controlled by union bosses, the result was very close. Labor became the biggest single party in the House, taking 59 seats—an 18-seat swing from 1966.  It also won a bare majority of the two-party-preferred vote, winning 50.2 percent to the Coalition's 49.8 percent—a 7.1-point swing from 1966, the largest not to have resulted in a change of government.  However, largely due to the Democratic Labor Party preferencing against Labor, especially in Victoria, Whitlam came up four seats short of toppling the Coalition. Nonetheless, Whitlam recovered much of what Labor had lost in its severe defeat three years earlier, and put the party within striking distance of winning government three years later.

Results

Seats changing hands

 Members listed in italics did not contest their seat at this election.

See also
 1967 Australian Senate election
 1970 Australian Senate election
 Candidates of the Australian federal election, 1969
 Members of the Australian House of Representatives, 1969–1972
 Don's Party

Notes

References
University of WA  election results in Australia since 1890
AEC 2PP vote
Prior to 1984 the AEC did not undertake a full distribution of preferences for statistical purposes. The stored ballot papers for the 1983 election were put through this process prior to their destruction. Therefore, the figures from 1983 onwards show the actual result based on full distribution of preferences.

Federal elections in Australia
1969 elections in Australia
Gough Whitlam
October 1969 events in Australia